The 1987 VFL Grand Final was an Australian rules football game contested between the  Carlton Football Club and Hawthorn Football Club, held at the Melbourne Cricket Ground in Melbourne on 26 September 1987. It was the 91st annual Grand Final of the Victorian Football League, staged to determine the premiers for the 1987 VFL season. The match, attended by 92,754 spectators, was won by Carlton by a margin of 33 points, marking that club's 15th premiership victory.

Background

At the conclusion of the home and away season, Carlton had finished first on the VFL ladder with 18 wins and 4 losses. Those four losses were by a combined total of just 56 points. It had been a tumultuous year off the field for the Blues; premiership defender Des English was in an ongoing health battle since being diagnosed with leukemia the previous year, and rising star Peter Motley nearly lost his life in a serious car accident early in the season.

Hawthorn finished second, with 17 wins and 5 losses.

Carlton had only beaten Hawthorn in two of the last twelve games in which the two teams had met, although they had defeated them most recently in the Second-Semi Final leading up to the Grand Final. The Hawks had advanced to the Grand Final after defeating Sydney in the first Qualifying Final, and, after the Second-Semi Final, defeated Melbourne by just two points in the Preliminary Final (with a goal kicked after the final siren) to advance to the Grand Final. The Blues had an easier finals run, earning a weeks rest before the Second Semi Final and then advancing straight to the Grand Final after their Second-Semi Final win.

It was Hawthorn's fifth successive Grand Final appearance and it had beaten Carlton in the previous season's Grand Final by 42 points. Carlton had not won a flag since winning the 1982 VFL Grand Final.

In the week leading up to the Grand Final, Hawthorn's John Platten was awarded the Brownlow Medal.

Teams

Umpires 
The umpiring panel for the match, comprising two field umpires, two boundary umpires and two goal umpires is given below.

Numbers in brackets represent the number of grand finals umpired, including 1987.

Match summary
The game was played on a very hot day, with temperatures reaching 30.7 degrees Celsius. It broke the previous record for the warmest Grand Final day temperature set in 1944 and would remain the warmest on record until the 2015 AFL Grand Final. Such was the heat that Stephen Silvagni, who for most of his career wore a long-sleeved guernsey, started the match without sleeves. It was also the only time in 426 games that Hawthorn captain Michael Tuck wore a sleeveless jumper, with he and Carlton's Mark Naley both starting the game wearing long sleeves and changing to short-sleeves part way through the game. The heat was thought to favour Carlton after Hawthorn had finished a very tough finals campaign. Hawthorn were also without Jason Dunstall who had kicked 94 goals for the year and 6 against the Blues in the previous year's Grand Final but was out of the game with an ankle injury.  Instead the Hawks played Paul Dear at full-forward.
In the pre-match festivities, the coin was tossed by Wimbledon champion and Hawks fan Pat Cash. Michael Tuck won the toss and chose to kick to the Punt Road End.

First quarter
Carlton were switched from the beginning when renowned finals specialist Johnston alerted umpire Robinson (who was officiating in his ninth Grand final and final VFL game) that Hawthorn had one extra player in the centre square before the ball had been bounced. Umpire Robinson blew the whistle to begin the game and promptly handed the ball to Johnston to take the free kick. His long kick into attack was marked strongly by Hunter 35 metres from goal directly in front, but missed the opening shot at goal. Carlton managed to retrieve possession from the kick-in, and Johnston was awarded another free kick for being tripped by Collins and duly converted his set shot for the first goal of the game. Barely a minute later, Carlton went into attack again through Dennis and Dorotich but Meldrum was unable to finish accurately.
The Hawks had their first score on the board when a snap from Schwab from a restart bounce in attack missed to the left. From the kick-in, Hawthorn's enforcer wingman DiPierdomenico collected the ball and was charging forward when Johnston caught him flush with an elbow to the jaw, for which he earned a report. Carlton continued to struggle with accuracy when Naley's snap missed to the right, until finally Johnston picked up the ball after Schwab had lost it in a tackle and dashed forward before steadying and kicking truly on his trusty left foot for his second goal at the 12-minute mark. And when Hunter compensated for his early miss a few minutes later by converting his set shot from nearly the same position, Carlton had kicked three goals to set up a 20-point lead. 
But the battle-hardened Hawks were too experienced to panic. Kennedy, who had been playing on Hunter, was moved forward and kicked Hawthorn's first, swooping on to a kick forward from Collins and snapping truly on his right as time-on began. Platten and DiPierdomenico added further goals from set shots, and when Kennedy kicked his second after the quarter-time siren, the Hawks had grabbed a three-point lead, despite having been outplayed for much of the term. As that day's Norm Smith Medallist David Rhys-Jones recalled in an interview many years later:
I couldn't believe it, as we had dominated the play. It just shows what a great team Hawthorn was. We knew we had to play 100 minutes to beat the Hawks because they would keep coming at us.

Second quarter
Carlton again started strongly when Kernahan and Hunter combined to find Bradley in open space and running hard towards goal, enabling him to easily score his first for the game and restore Carlton's lead. At the 4-minute mark, Carlton added another goal after a grubby kick across the backline from Mew put Ayres under pressure from Meldrum, allowing Dorotich to pounce on the ball and kick his first.

Third quarter

Aftermath
The Norm Smith Medal was presented by former Melbourne champion and premiership captain John Beckwith to Carlton's David Rhys-Jones. Normally a wingman, he instead lined up in defence on Hawthorn's key forward Dermott Brereton in what many considered a mismatch. Rhys-Jones only collected 17 disposals and four marks for the game (9 kicks, 8 handpasses), but in keeping Brereton goalless for the only time in the 1987 season and marshalling his fellow defenders throughout the game, he was unanimously considered best on ground. It was sweet revenge for both Carlton and Rhys-Jones; in the previous season's Grand Final defeat, his direct opponent had been Gary Ayres, who went on to win the first of his two Norm Smith Medals.

Victorious Carlton coach Robert Walls credited the hard work and improvement of his players:
It was very satisfying that we won the premiership, because the players have worked very hard. There are kids who have come into the side and are a pretty good blend and a lot of players have improved..

Epilogue
Just two months after the disappointment of losing the Grand final, Hawthorn were dealt another blow when coach Allan Jeans was admitted to hospital with a brain haemorrhage. Although surgery to repair an aneurysm was successful, the health scare was serious enough to force Jeans to stand out of football for the whole of the 1988 VFL season. After not being picked for the Grand Final, club stalwart Rodney Eade left the club and went to Brisbane. 
<br/ >

For Carlton, the victory was atonement for last year's defeat, and served as a tribute to the fighting spirit shown by Des English and Peter Motley, (English was having treatment for cancer and Motley suffered permanent injuries from a car accident) who joined the celebrations in the dressing room. However, Johnston and Madden had both been reported for striking. They would both miss the first two matches of the 1988 season. After losing to Melbourne in the 1988 Preliminary Final, the Blues would not play in a Grand Final again until 1993.

Scorecard

References

Bibliography

External links

Carlton's 1987 premiership 30 years on
How Carlton won 1987 premiership

See also
 1987 VFL season

VFL/AFL Grand Finals
Vfl Grand Final, 1987
Carlton Football Club
Hawthorn Football Club